Rowan Woods (born 1959) is an Australian AACTA Award-winning film and television director, actor and screenwriter.

Career

Film
Woods directed The Boys in 1998 and won an ACCTA Award for Best Direction. The film was also entered into the 48th Berlin International Film Festival. His next film, Little Fish was released in September 2005 starring Cate Blanchett. His latest film, Fragments was released in 2009, and received mixed, but mostly negative reviews from critics.

Television
He has directed episodes of television series including Farscape, Fireflies, Police Rescue, and Spartacus: Blood and Sand.

In 2012, he directed The Straits and some episodes of Rake between 2012 and 2016. In 2016, he directed the acclaimed The Kettering Incident, and also Nowhere Boys.

In 2013, he directed The Broken Shore, a Duncan Lawrie Dagger award-winning novel by Australian author Peter Temple.

References

External links

1959 births
Living people
Australian film directors
Australian television directors
Australian Film Television and Radio School alumni